The Ministry of Nostalgia is a 2016 book by British writer Owen Hatherley.

Synopsis
The Ministry of Nostalgia argues that "our past is being resold in order to defend the indefensible". The book examines the so-called "austerity" of the 1940s and 1950s and argues that history has been "recast to offer consolation for the violence of neoliberalism, an ideology dedicated to the privatisation of our common wealth". The Ministry of Nostalgia questions "why should we have to keep calm and carry on?"

Reception
In The Independent Marcus Tanner supports the conclusions of the book that "austerity" in the post-War UK was redistributive, with those on higher incomes paying more for the introduction of the welfare state.

References

2016 non-fiction books
Books by Owen Hatherley
Books critical of capitalism
Books about politics of the United Kingdom
Non-fiction books about consumerism
Nostalgia
Verso Books books